Sergey Mikhailovich Buikevich (born 13 August 1963) is a Kazakhstani dressage and endurance rider.  He represented Kazakhstan at two World Equestrian Games in individual dressage competitions. At the 2006 World Equestrian Games in Aachen he rode Volan and was eliminated during the Grand Prix test. At his second Games in 2014 he finished 95th individually with Ispovednik.

He also competed for Kazakhstan at two Asian Games.

References

Living people
1963 births
Kazakhstani male equestrians
Equestrians at the 1994 Asian Games
Equestrians at the 2006 Asian Games
Equestrians at the 2014 Asian Games
Asian Games competitors for Kazakhstan
Kazakhstani dressage riders
21st-century Kazakhstani people